The men's high jump at the 1969 European Athletics Championships was held in Athens, Greece, at Georgios Karaiskakis Stadium on 18 and 19 September 1969.

Medalists

Results

Final
19 September

Qualification
18 September

Participation
According to an unofficial count, 23 athletes from 14 countries participated in the event.

 (2)
 (1)
 (1)
 (3)
 (1)
 (2)
 (1)
 (2)
 (3)
 (1)
 (2)
 (2)
 (1)
 (1)

References

High jump
High jump at the European Athletics Championships